Infinite Storm is a 2022 American drama adventure film directed by Małgorzata Szumowska, co-directed by Michał Englert, and with a screenplay by Josh Rollins, based on the article High Places: Footprints in the Snow Lead to an Emotional Rescue by Ty Gagne. The film stars Naomi Watts, Billy Howle, Denis O'Hare, Parker Sawyers and Eliot Sumner.

Infinite Storm was released in the United States on March 25, 2022, by Bleecker Street.

The film received mixed reviews from critics.

Plot
Pam Bales is a search and rescue volunteer who sets off one fateful morning on a hike taking her to the top of Mount Washington. All of a sudden a fierce storm sets in but she sees tracks in the snow of someone wearing only sneakers. She comes across a strange-acting, incoherent man she calls "John" and the two begin a dangerous trek down the mountain to safety, facing many obstacles along the way and almost drowning at one point. During this time, Pam has various "flashbacks" regarding her two young daughters. After almost freezing to death, the two manage to make it to safety only to have "John" drive off suddenly without so much as a thank you. Pam tries to find out his real name and at the end, the two have an emotional meeting at a coffee shop where she mentions that her two little girls died from a gas leak and he mentions a loved one that had frozen to death on the mountain the previous year.

Cast
 Naomi Watts as Pam Bales
 Billy Howle as John
 Denis O'Hare as Dave
 Parker Sawyers as Patrick
 Eliot Sumner as Hiker Bill
 Josh Rollins as Finn

Production
In February 2021, it was announced Naomi Watts, Sophie Okonedo, Billy Howle, Denis O'Hare and Parker Sawyers had joined the cast of the film, with Małgorzata Szumowska and Michał Englert set to direct the film, from a screenplay by Josh Rollins. Watts will also serve as a producer on the film, with Bleecker Street set to distribute in the United States, and Sony Pictures Worldwide Acquisitions distributing internationally.

Principal photography began on February 1, 2021 and concluded on May 1, 2021. Kamnik, Slovenia, (22 km/14 miles north of Ljubljana, Slovenia’s capital) is the primary filming location of ‘Infinite Storm.’ Most of the movie was shot on location in and around the town. Filming took place on Velika Planina, a nature trail above Kamnik. The cast and crew also filmed some footage in Kamniška Bistrica Valley, which lies close to the source of the Kamnik Bistrica river. Some scenes were shot at International Picnic Center (aka Pri Jurju) in the same region.

Release
The film was released on March 25, 2022.

Box office
In the United States and Canada, Infinite Storm was released alongside The Lost City and RRR, and was projected to gross less than $1.5million from 1,525 theaters in its opening weekend. The film earned $758,919 in its opening weekend, and $294,538 in its second. It added $16,237 (a drop of 95%) in its third weekend and $2,916 (a drop of 82%) in its fourth.

Critical response
The review aggregator Rotten Tomatoes reported an approval rating of 55%, with an average rating of 5.9/10, based on 60 reviews. The site's critics' consensus reads: "Infinite Storms dramatization of a real-life story feels frustratingly incomplete, but that's often outweighed by Naomi Watts' outstanding performance." At Metacritic the film has a weighted average score of 56 out of 100, based on 18 critics, indicating "mixed or average reviews". According to PostTrak, 55% of audience members gave the film a super tank mixed reviews.

References

External links
 

2022 drama films
2022 films
American drama films
Films based on newspaper and magazine articles
Films directed by Małgorzata Szumowska
Bleecker Street films
Films produced by Trudie Styler
Films scored by Lorne Balfe
Mountaineering films
English-language Polish films
Films set in New Hampshire
Films shot in Slovenia
2020s English-language films
2020s American films